John Raymond Patrick Fogarty (c. 18 October 1928 – 9 July 2007) was an Australian rugby union and rugby league footballer. He played two tests as a winger for the Wallabies in 1949.

Fogarty started playing rugby for St. Joseph's Nudgee College in Brisbane. He played for Brothers Old Boys in the Brisbane club rugby competition. in a golden era for the club. He represented Queensland as a winger.

Fogarty was a small player but was very fast and a good tackler.

In 1949, Fogarty was chosen in two tests against a New Zealand Maori side in Brisbane and Sydney. He was also a member of the Australian touring team to New Zealand led by Trevor Allan that won the Bledisloe Cup for the first time.

Fogarty's rugby league career included stints playing with Taree, Balmain, Brisbane Brothers and Herbert River. He also played one match for Queensland against New South Wales in 1952.

He died of lung cancer in 2007.

References

Queensland representatives at qrl.com.au

1928 births
2007 deaths
Australia international rugby union players
Australian rugby league players
Australian rugby union players
Brothers Old Boys players
Deaths from lung cancer
Sportsmen from Queensland
Rugby league players from Brisbane
Rugby union players from Brisbane
Rugby union wings